Nestor's cup is an eighth century BC wine cup discovered in 1954 in Lacco Ameno, the ancient trading market site of Pithekoussai, on Ischia, an island in the Gulf of Naples (Italy).  The cup has a three-line inscription, one of the earliest surviving examples of writing in the Greek alphabet.

Cup
The cup is a skyphos or kotyle made in Rhodes in the eighth century BC, and decorated in the Geometric style. It was found in 1954 in a cremation grave on the island of Ischia, home of the ancient Pithekoussai, dating to a little before 700 BC. 

Previous osteological analysis suggested that the cremated remains associated with Nestor's cup, and the grave itself, were of a child aged around 10 to 14.  However, a more recent analysis conducted by the bioarchaeologist Melania Gigante and her team suggests that the remains are actually of three adult individuals of varying ages. Moreover, some of the burnt skeletal remains from the tomb are faunal, pointing to the use of animals during the cremation ritual. Along with the cup, Nestor's tomb also contained fragments of 25 other vases, as well as a silver fibula.  The body was cremated on a pyre separate from the grave, and the grave goods were ritually broken and burnt on the same pyre.

Inscription

A three-line inscription, scratched onto the side of the cup  is one of the earliest extant Greek inscriptions.  The inscription was added to the cup after its manufacture, and dates to the late eighth century.  The inscription is in a Euboean form of the alphabet, in small, neat letters.  All three lines are written from right to left – according to Meiggs and Lewis, "virtually unique in a Greek text".  The symbol ":" is used as punctuation.

The second and third lines are in dactylic hexameter.  The form of the first line is less certain: it has been read as prose, iambic trimeter, catalectic trochaic trimeter, or a lyric meter.

The interpretation of the inscription depends on a lacuna in the first line: depending on how it is restored, the inscription may be contrasting the cup from Pithekoussai with the legendary cup of Nestor described in the Iliad (Iliad 11.632 ff.), or identifying the cup as one owned by Nestor.  The original publication of the inscription accepted the first possibility; by 1976, P. A. Hansen wrote that "no less than fifteen" possible restorations of the first lacuna had been published.  By the 1990s, it was generally thought that the cup is in fact claiming to be Nestor's.  The restoration proposed by Yves Gerhard in 2011 once again argues that the inscription is contrasting the Pithekoussan cup with that of Nestor.

Notes

References

Works cited
 
 
 
 
 
 
 
 
 
 
 
 
 

Archaeological artifacts
Earliest known manuscripts by language
Greek language
Art of Magna Graecia
Iliad
Individual ancient Greek vases
Greek inscriptions
Archaeological discoveries in Italy